The metropolitan area is the 178th-largest United States metropolitan area and covers all of Webb county, with a population of 250,304. It is also a part of the Laredo-Nuevo Laredo Metropolitan Area with an estimate population of 689,022 in 2020.

Communities

Cities 
El Cenizo
Laredo (county seat)
Rio Bravo

Census-designated places

Aguilares
Bonanza Hills
Botines
Bruni
Colorado Acres
Four Points
Hillside Acres
La Coma
La Moca Ranch Colonia
La Presa
Laredo Ranchettes
Laredo Ranchettes West
Larga Vista
Las Haciendas
Las Pilas
Los Altos
Los Arcos
Los Centenarios
Los Corralitos
Los Fresnos
Los Huisaches
Los Minerales
Los Nopalitos
Los Veteranos I
Los Veteranos II
Mirando City
Oilton
Pueblo East
Pueblo Nuevo
Ranchitos East
Ranchitos Las Lomas
Ranchos Penitas West
San Carlos I
San Carlos II
Sunset Acres
Tanquecitos South Acres
Tanquecitos South Acres II
Valle Verde

Additional unincorporated communities
Source: Webb County Planning and Physical Development Department

Antonio Santos Colonia
Cactus
Callaghan
D-5 Acres Colonia
Darwin
Del Mar East
Fort McIntosh
Gate Acres Colonia
Islitas
Las Blancas Colonia
Las Tiendas
Los Ojuelos
Minera
Nye
Old Milwaukee East
Old Milwaukee West
One River Place Colonia
Orvil
Palafox
Pescadito
Ranchitos los Mesquites Colonia
Regency Village Colonia
Rodriguez Addition Colonia
San Pablo
San Ramon
Santo Tomás
Village East Colonia
Webb

Geography

Major highways
 Interstate 35
 Interstate 69W (Under construction)
 U.S. Highway 59
 U.S. Highway 83
 State Highway 44
 State Highway 255
 State Highway 359

Demographics

As of the census of 2000, there were 193,117 people, 50,740 households, and 43,433 families residing in the county. The county gained 57,000 additional residents between 2000 and 2010. The racial makeup of the county was 82.16% White, 0.37% Black or African American, 0.47% Native American, 0.43% Asian, 0.02% Pacific Islander, 14.00% from other races, and 2.54% from two or more races. 94.28% of the population were Hispanic or Latino of any race.

There were 50,740 households, out of which 53.20% had children under the age of 18 living with them, 62.60% were married couples living together, 18.30% had a female householder with no husband present, and 14.40% were non-families. 12.40% of all households were made up of individuals, and 5.10% had someone living alone who was 65 years of age or older. The average household size was 3.75 and the average family size was 4.10.

In the county, the age distribution of the population shows 36.20% under the age of 18, 11.40% from 18 to 24, 29.30% from 25 to 44, 15.60% from 45 to 64, and 7.60% who were 65 years of age or older. The median age was 26 years. For every 100 females, there were 92.90 males. For every 100 females age 18 and over, there were 87.90 males.

The median income for a household in the county was $28,100, and the median income for a family was $29,394. Males had a median income of $23,618 versus $19,018 for females. The per capita income for the county was $10,759. About 26.70% of families and 31.20% of the population were below the poverty line, including 39.40% of those under age 18 and 26.90% of those age 65 or over.

Laredo top employers

Colleges and universities
Laredo is home to Laredo Community College and Texas A&M International University (TAMIU). The University of Texas Health Science Center at San Antonio has a campus in Laredo.

The Laredo Community College is a two-campus institution which offers two-year Associate's degrees. The main campus is located at the western end of downtown Laredo near the Rio Grande, on the site of the former Fort McIntosh. This fort played a major role in the development of Laredo, as it served to protect the community from Indian raids in its early history. Several of the old buildings at the fort were converted into classrooms, but after renovation programs nearly all of the campus structures are now modern. The smaller, newer second campus, Laredo Community College South Campus, is located in south Laredo along U. S. Route 83.

The Texas A&M International University is a 4/6-year university that offers bachelor's and master's degrees. On April 22, 2004, the Texas Higher Education Coordinating Board in Austin, Texas provided its approval for Texas A&M International University to grant its first PhD in International Business Administration. TAMIU's College of Business Administration has been named an outstanding business school in The Princeton Review's "Best 282 Business Schools", 2007 Edition, and ranked third in the nation for the category: "Greatest Opportunity for Minority Students." The university's campus is located in Northeast Laredo along Loop 20. The university was once an extension of Texas A&I-Kingsville and later the former Laredo State University. Prior to its current location along Bob Bullock Loop 20, the university was housed with the Laredo Community College downtown campus.

The University of Texas Health Science Center campus is located in East Laredo near U.S. Highway 59 and the Laredo Medical Center. The campus is an extension university from UTHSC in San Antonio, Texas. The university offers doctoral degrees in the medical and dental fields.

Media

Newspapers

Television
According to Nielsen Media Research, the Laredo region (which includes Webb and Zapata counties) is ranked 185th market by population size in the United States. The first station to broadcast in Laredo was KGNS in 1956, followed by KVTV in 1973, then KJTB (now KLDO) in 1985.

Notably television networks missing from Laredo's airwaves are PBS and The CW. Laredo once had a full-power local The CW affiliate, KGNS-DT2, but on July 3, 2014, the affiliation switched to ABC. Prior to that KJTB channel 27, from January 1985 to October 1988 was Laredo's ABC affiliate. KJTB was later bought by Entravision and affiliated the station to Telemundo and changed its callsign to KLDO. Today KLDO is affiliated to Univision. Before KJTB, KGNS, an NBC affiliate had a secondary affiliation to ABC from its founding in 1956 through KJTB's founding in 1985. On November 6, 2013, KGNS reached an agreement to add the ABC affiliation. The ABC affiliate was to have been launched in February 2014 on KGNS's subchannel 8.2. But it was not until July 2014 when KGNS dropped The CW programming and added ABC programming.

In December 2014, all Nuevo Laredo stations must turn off analog television broadcasting and broadcast only digitally.

CP: Construction permit

Radio
According to Arbitron, the Laredo region (which includes Jim Hogg, Webb, and Zapata counties) is ranked 191st market by population size.

AM radio

Long-range AM stations
The following clear channel AM stations can be heard in Laredo:

FM radio

PR:Suspected pirate radio stations since they are not licensed with Federal Communications Commission (FCC) in the United States or COFETEL in Mexico. Some pirate stations are suspected, due to the fact that other licensed stations nearby share the same frequency, such as 106.5 Radio Voz and KMAE from nearby Bruni, Texas and 103.3 Radio 33 and XHAHU-FM from nearby Anáhuac, Nuevo León, each city less than 50 miles from Laredo.

Internet radio

Infrastructure

Health care

In addition to the University of Texas Health Science Center branch, there are five other principal medical centers in Laredo: the Laredo Medical Center, Doctor's Hospital, Gateway Community Health Center, Providence Surgical & Medical Center, and the Laredo Specialty Hospital.

Doctors Hospital is the second-largest medical center in Laredo. Affiliated with Universal Health Services, it is located on Loop 20 in north Laredo. The Doctors Regional Cancer Treatment Center offers comprehensive cancer services.

The Providence Surgical & Medical Center is an ambulatory health care center located in north-central Laredo and also owned by Universal Health Services.

The Gateway Community Health Center is the third-largest medical center in Laredo. The Medical center moved to its new $11,000,000 building in 2006. The main Gateway Community Health Center is located in East Laredo, close to U.S. Highway 59. It also has three branches in the Laredo area: the South Clinic, El Cenizo Community Center, and Quad City Community Center.
Gateway Community Health Center services include:

The Laredo Specialty Hospital is the fourth-largest medical center in Laredo. It is owned by Ernest Health Inc. and was founded by Elmo Lopez, Jr., on May 22, 2006, and admitted its first patient within hours of operation. The grand opening was held in March 2007.

Transportation

Air

Laredo is served by the Laredo International Airport. Daily flights are available to Houston (George Bush Intercontinental Airport) and to Dallas/Fort Worth International Airport. Tri-weekly flights to Las Vegas, Nevada are available. After Laredo Air Force Base closed in the mid-1970s, the federal government handed over the old air force base and property to the City of Laredo for a new municipal airport. From the mid-1970s until the mid-1990s, the airport utilized a small terminal for passenger airline service and several old hangars for air cargo and private aircraft. A new state-of-the art passenger terminal was built along the then newly constructed Loop 20 to accommodate larger jets and to increase passenger air travel through Laredo. Expansion of air cargo facilities, taxiways and aprons, air cargo carriers such as DHL, FedEx, UPS, BAX, and others have responded by adding commercial air cargo jet services. Laredo also has two medical helipads, at Laredo Medical Center and Doctor's Hospital.

Mass transit
El Metro is the public transit system that operates in the city with 21 fixed routes and Paratransit services, with approximately 4.6 million passengers per year. El Metro works with a fleet of over 47 fixed route buses, 2 trolleys and 18 Paratransit/El Lift vans. The El Metro hub is located in downtown Laredo at El Metro Transit Center. The center also houses Greyhound Bus Lines and provides fee-based daily parking for downtown shoppers and workers.

Rural transit
Rural transportation is provided by the Webb County operated "El Aguila Rural Transportation" (the Eagle) bus services. El Aguila serves fixed daily routes from rural communities (Bruni, El Cenizo, Mirando City, Oilton, and Rio Bravo) to the downtown El Metro Transit Center.

Sports

Laredo Heat
The Laredo Heat is a United Soccer Leagues Premier Development League team. The team's home stadium is the Texas A&M International University Soccer Complex. The team was founded in 2004. It plays in the Mid-South Division of the Southern Conference in the 2006 season the Laredo Heat finished Runner-up yet made it only to the first round of the Open Cup. In the 2007 season, the Laredo Heat were the Southern Conference champions. And in 2007 Laredo heat won its first PDL Championship.

Laredo Honey Badgers
The Laredo Honey Badgers, is professional indoor soccer team to be based in Laredo, Texas. Founded in April 2013, the team is expected to make its debut in the Professional Arena Soccer League with the 2013–14 season. The team will play its home games at the Laredo Energy Arena. The official name and colors (black and chrome) of the team were decided with fan participation.

Laredo Lemurs
The Laredo Lemurs, a professional baseball team based in Laredo, played their first season in the independent American Association in 2012. They won the South Division in their inaugural season, but were eliminated in the first playoff round. They play their home games at Uni-Trade Stadium.

Laredo Roses
The Laredo Roses are a professional women's full contact football team in the South Texas Sugar N Spice Football League that began play in the 2012 season. The Roses play their home games at the Uni-Trade Stadium. The female players use short shorts and halfcut jerseys during games.

Defunct teams

Stadiums and arenas

Laredo Energy Arena

The Laredo Energy Arena, formerly Laredo Entertainment Center, is located at Loop 20 and Jacaman Road. The LEA was strongly pushed to fruition by former Laredo Mayor Betty Flores. LEA was home to the former Laredo Bucks. The , $36.5 million facility seats 8,002 people for ice hockey and arena football, and up to 10,000 for concerts. It has fourteen luxury suites, four meeting rooms and a private club for two hundred charter members. It was completed in mid-2002 through an increase in the Laredo sales tax of .25 percent. Sports that can be played at the LEA include hockey, arena football, indoor soccer, basketball, wrestling, and boxing. The arena also hosts many events such as the Laredo Hunting and Fishing Show, Miss Texas USA, Laredo Home and Garden Show, and high school graduation ceremonies. Well-known artists and bands that have performed in the arena include Lil Wayne, Rihanna, Kesha, Pitbull, Flo Rida, Shakira, Enrique Iglesias, Tool, Aerosmith, Kiss, Elton John, Styx, REO Speedwagon, ZZ Top, Lynyrd Skynyrd, Ricky Martin, George Lopez, T.I., Ludacris, Cher, Hilary Duff Monster Jam and WWE.

Uni-Trade Stadium
The Uni-Trade Stadium is Laredo's newest baseball field. The stadium is located near the Laredo Energy Arena. The project was first approved by the city council and was voted in favor of (with 61.32% of the votes in favor 38.68% against) constructing it with money collected since 2004 by a .25 percent sales tax increase. There is a surplus of about $15 million. The stadium will be home to the Laredo Lemurs.

Student Activity Complex

Student Activity Complex is located on State Highway 359. It is utilized for United Independent School District's students. It was opened in the summer of 2002 and it contains the city's first artificial grass stadium. The SAC was also the home of the Laredo Heat. The capacity is 8,500 spectators. Sports played at the SAC include football, soccer, and baseball.

Texas A&M International University Soccer Complex
Texas A&M International University Soccer Complex (also known as Dustdevil Field and TAMIU Soccer Complex) was built in 2006 and renovated in 2007. The soccer complex is located at the Texas A&M International University campus. The complex has two soccer stadiums with a seating capacity of four thousand each. The Dustdevil Field is the new home stadium to the 2007 champion team Laredo Heat member of the United Soccer Leagues Premier Development League (PDL) and the TAMIU Dustdevils women and men's soccer teams member of the Heartland Conference, NCAA Division II.

Shirley Field
The original Shirley Field was located next to the Civic Center and R&T Martin High School on San Bernardo Avenue. It was built in 1937, along with Martin High School. Shirley Field was the location for outdoor athletics for Laredo Independent School District and also hosts the annual Border Olympics events. It seats up to about 6,000 fans with additional seating at the 2 endzones. Professional Mexican soccer teams have played various exhibition games here, noting that the real grass allows for "better" soccer games. The various sports played on the stadium are football, soccer and track & field events. Major renovations are slated for this historic stadium. In November 2009 Shirley Field was demolished and was rebuilt by the 2011 football season. The total cost of the reconstruction was $12,000,000 and it now seats 8,000 fans and features artificial turf.

Krueger Field
Krueger Field is located in north Laredo and is owned by United independent school District. The stadium has a capacity of 5,000 and is used to play football and soccer high school games. It is home to United High School's and John B. Alexander High School's football and soccer teams.

Veterans Field
Veterans Field is a baseball park which was previously known as West Martin Field. Its capacity is about 5,000. Major renovation is happening to update the 1950 ball park. Veterans Field was also the home to the five-time champion Mexican Baseball League team Tecolotes de los Dos Laredos from 1985 to 2003. Veterans Field is also home to the Texas A&M International University's Heartland Conference NCAA Division II Dustdevils baseball team.

Laredo Civic Center
Prior to the construction of the Laredo Energy Arena most major concerts and shows were performed at the Laredo Civic Center. The Laredo Civic Center complex has an auditorium with 1,979 seats and a banquet and exhibit hall with 1,635 seats.

References

 
Metropolitan areas of Texas